KEFB (channel 34) was a religious television station licensed to Ames, Iowa, United States, which served the Des Moines area as an affiliate of the Trinity Broadcasting Network (TBN). Owned by Family Educational Broadcasting, the station maintained a transmitter southwest of Ames. In addition to TBN programming, KEFB also served the community as an independent educational station.

History
The station was originally granted a construction permit on July 12, 1996, as provisional station 960712KL. The station would not be officially granted a full license until 2005, when they were granted the call letters KEFB.

Shutdown
On September 20, 2016, Family Educational Broadcasting announced it was permanently discontinuing all operations of KEFB and returning the station's license to the Federal Communications Commission (FCC). KEFB's license was formally canceled and its callsign deleted on October 5, 2016. TBN programming remains available in the Des Moines–Ames area via the network's national feed on Mediacom channel 92.

Technical information

Subchannels
The station's digital signal was multiplexed:

Analog-to-digital conversion
KEFB shut down its analog signal, over UHF channel 34, on June 12, 2009, and "flash-cut" its digital signal into operation on UHF channel 34. Because it was granted an original construction permit after the FCC finalized the DTV allotment plan on April 21, 1997, the station did not receive a companion channel for a digital television station.

References

Television stations in Des Moines, Iowa
Defunct television stations in the United States
Television channels and stations established in 2005
2005 establishments in Iowa
Television channels and stations disestablished in 2016
2016 disestablishments in Iowa
Defunct mass media in Iowa